The Annie Birch House, near Hoytsville, Utah, was built in 1875.  It was listed on the National Register of Historic Places in 1984.

It is located at approximately 900 S. West Hoytsville Rd., off I-80.

It is a vernacular Pair House.

References

Pair-houses
National Register of Historic Places in Summit County, Utah
Houses completed in 1875